Carenum lepidum is a species of ground beetle in the subfamily Scaritinae. It was described by Sloane in 1890.

References

lepidum
Beetles described in 1890